Centria University of Applied Sciences (former name Central Ostrobothnia University of Applied Sciences) is a private-recognized higher education institution in Finland.

The name Centria University of Applied Sciences is derived from Central Ostrobothnia University of Applied Sciences and officially used from the start of autumn semester 2012.

The University has three campuses: Kokkola, Jakobstad and Ylivieska. Internationalisation is one of Centria's core values thus the University offers three international bachelor's degree programmes taught in English, namely DP in business management, DP in industrial management, and DP in information technology. Centria also has one master's degree programme, DP in international business management. Centria is a multidisciplinary, dynamic and international institution, which offers students and staff an environment that is innovative, caring and multicultural.

Organization
Centria University of Applied Sciences is owned by a limited liability company whose shareholders are the Central Ostrobothnia Education Group, Kalajoki Municipal Education and Training Consortium, Pietarsaari City, Raudaskylan Christian College Association and Central Ostrobothnia Conservatory Support Association. At present, the Rector of Central Ostrobothnia University of Applied Sciences is Mr. Pekka Hulkko.

Studies in Centria University of Applied Sciences
Centria is multidisciplinary institution located in Western Finland, Northern Europe and offers 13 degree programmes in the fields of:

• Technology, Communications and Transport

• Social Sciences, Business and Administration

• Social Services, Health and Sports

• Culture

• Humanities and Education

The extent of UAS degree studies is generally 210−240 study points (ECTS), which means 3.5 – 4 years of full-time study. This education is arranged as degree programmes. The entry requirement is a certificate from an upper secondary school or the matriculation certificate, a vocational qualification or corresponding foreign studies. The requirement for Master's studies in UAS is a Bachelors' level UAS degree and at least three years of work experience. The UAS Master's, which is 60-90 study points and takes 1.5–2 years, is equivalent to a university Master's in the labour market. Each student has a personal study plan, which facilitates student guidance and the monitoring of progress in studies. Students apply for UAS studies in a national application system. The UAS determine the admission criteria and arrange student selection and entrance examination at their discretion. Nearly 90% of applications are submitted electronically. UAS also arrange adult education and open education geared to maintain and upgrade competencies. Some 20 percent of UAS students are mature students.

Enrollment

In Centria, there are around 2900 students in 5 fields and 13 degree programmes.

Annual intake is 500 students.

R&D Services
Annually Centria participates in more than 100 separate r&d–projects.

See also
Ammattikorkeakoulu
Education in Finland
List of polytechnics in Finland
List of universities in Finland
List of colleges and universities
List of colleges and universities by country

References

Education in Ostrobothnia (region)
Education in North Ostrobothnia